Pēteris Slavens (Slaven, Pyotr Antonovich) (Cēsis, 5 April 1874 – Valmiera, 14 November 1919) was a Latvian Soviet military commander, who fought in the Russian Civil War.

Military career
Slavens attended from 1893 a Junker-school and entered in the Tsarist Army. 

In 1917, he retired as a regimental commander for health reasons and was in various hospitals for treatment. 
After the October Revolution, he was forcibly re-activated by the Red Army in the summer of 1918, despite his poor health. 
He commanded first a division, then from August the 5th Army in the East, and until January 1919 the Southern Front in the Russian Civil War. 

Because of illness, Slavens went to Riga, where from March he again had to take up the command of the Soviet Latvian Army.
He was blamed by the Party leadership for the devastating defeat in May 1919, and court martial investigations were started against him. Slavens received his demobilization for health reasons and then illegally crossed the border into independent Latvia. 

The local authorities detained Slavens in November 1919 and put him in a POW camp, where he died in hospital from pneumonia.

Sources
 Inta Pētersone (Hrsg.): Latvijas Brīvības cīņas 1918 - 1920. Enciklopēdja. Preses nams, Riga 1999, . Seite 399–400

1874 births
1919 deaths
Latvian Riflemen
Military personnel of the Russian Empire
Russian military personnel of World War I
People of the Russian Civil War
Deaths from pneumonia in Latvia
Russian people imprisoned abroad
Russian people who died in prison custody
Prisoners who died in Latvian detention